August Jürima (also August Jürman(n); 8 February 1902 Pajusi Parish (now Põltsamaa Parish), Kreis Fellin – 9 January 1947 Erlangen, American Zone, Allied-occupied Germany) was an Estonian politician. He was a member of VI Riigikogu (its Chamber of Deputies).

References

1902 births
1947 deaths
People from Põltsamaa Parish
People from Kreis Fellin
Patriotic League (Estonia) politicians
Members of the Estonian National Assembly
Members of the Riigivolikogu
Estonian World War II refugees
Estonian emigrants to Germany